Ravenswood School or Ravens Wood School may refer to:

Australia
 Ravenswood School for Girls, in Sydney
 Ravenswood Heights Primary School, in Ravenswood, Tasmania
 Ravenswood School and Residence, a heritage-listed house and school in Ravenswood, Queensland

United Kingdom
 Ravens Wood School in Bromley, England
 Ravenswood School, Nailsea, England
 Ravenswood Primary School, Heaton, Newcastle upon Tyne
 Ravenswood Primary, Ravenswood, Cumbernauld, North Lanarkshire
 Ravenswood Community Primary School, Ipswich, Suffolk
 Ravenswood Prep School, Stoodleigh, Devon, closed in 1991
 Ravenswood School, Derbyshire, 2012–14, a defunct independent school

United States
 Ravenswood High School (East Palo Alto) 
 Old Ravenswood School, in Ravenswood, Jackson County, West Virginia
 Ravenswood Grade School, in Ravenswood, Jackson County, West Virginia
 Ravenswood Middle School, in Ravenswood, Jackson County, West Virginia
 Ravenswood High School (West Virginia), in Ravenswood, Jackson County, West Virginia

See also
 Ravenswood City School District, Palo Alto
 Ravenswood (disambiguation)